South Northamptonshire District Council in Northamptonshire, England was elected every four years. After the last boundary changes in 2007, 42 councillors were elected from 27 wards. The council was abolished in 2021, with the area becoming part of West Northamptonshire.

Political control
From the first election to the council in 1973 until its abolition in 2021, political control of the council was held by the following parties:

Leadership
The leaders of the council from 1999 until the council's abolition in 2021 were:

Council elections
1973 South Northamptonshire District Council election
1976 South Northamptonshire District Council election (New ward boundaries)
1979 South Northamptonshire District Council election
1983 South Northamptonshire District Council election
1987 South Northamptonshire District Council election
1991 South Northamptonshire District Council election (District boundary changes took place but the number of seats remained the same)
1995 South Northamptonshire District Council election
1999 South Northamptonshire District Council election (New ward boundaries increased the number of seats by 2)
2003 South Northamptonshire District Council election
2007 South Northamptonshire District Council election (New ward boundaries)
2011 South Northamptonshire District Council election
2015 South Northamptonshire District Council election

By-election results

1995-1999

1999-2003

2003-2007

2007-2011

2012

2018

References

By-election results

External links
South Northamptonshire District Council

 
South Northamptonshire District
Council elections in Northamptonshire
District council elections in England